Complex partial status epilepticus (CPSE) is one of the non-convulsive forms of status epilepticus, a rare form of epilepsy defined by its recurrent nature. CPSE is characterized by seizures involving long-lasting stupor, staring and unresponsiveness.  Sometimes this is accompanied by motor automatisms, such as eye twitching.

Diagnosis 

As is the case with other non-convulsive status epilepticus forms, CPSE is dangerously underdiagnosed. This is due to the potentially fatal yet veiled nature of the symptoms. Usually, an electroencephalogram, or EEG, is needed to confirm a neurologist's suspicions. The EEG is also needed to differentiate between absence status epilepticus (which affects the entire brain), and CPSE, which only affects one region.

Treatment 

Treatment is in the form of anti-epileptic drugs, such as barbiturates, benzodiazepines and topiramate.

References

External links 

Medical emergencies
Epilepsy